Silvia Ofelia Urbina Pinto (4 January 1928 – 20 January 2016) was a Chilean singer and folklorist. Urbina had a vast trajectory in the investigation, research and dissemination of folkloric music of Chile. She was one of the founders of the Cuncumén folkloric group and creator of the Cuncumenitos children's group.

Life and work 
Qualified as a Kindergarten Educator, she began her folklore studies with Margot Loyola at the seasonal schools of the University of Chile, and increased her knowledge with her friend Violeta Parra. In addition, she took different courses with Gabriela Pizarro, Raquel Barros, Manuel Denneman and Onofre Alvarado, among others. Urbina was a member of the Communist Party from a very young age.

She started her career as a musician in 1955 as one of the co-founders of the successful folk group, Cuncumén with Rolando Alarcón. With Cuncumén, they toured several countries, and had the opportunity to share the stage with the singer-songwriters Víctor Jara and Héctor Pavez. After leaving the group in 1961, she founded another group, Cuncumenitos, dedicated to teach Chilean children about folkloric music. He sang and recorded duet albums with musicians such as Rolando Alarcón and Patricio Manns. With the latter he recorded the voice of the song "Cautivo de Til Til". 

Later on, she would remain active in various folkloric settings. She has been president of the National Folklore Association of Chile, ANFOLCHI. In 2004 she was awarded the National Folklore Award, granted by the Chilean Folklorists and Guitarists Union. In 2012 she received a grace pension and a year later she was awarded the President of the Republic National Music Award. She had a son with Patricio Manns named Ian Manns Urbina. She, on January 20, 2016, died of a heart attack, at 88 years of age. She was fired at her funeral by representatives of the Communist Party, and her remains were buried in the Metropolitan Cemetery.

References 

1928 births
2016 deaths
20th-century Chilean women singers
Chilean folk singers
Nueva canción musicians
Place of birth missing

Chilean communists